Richard Green Spurling  (1857 – 1935) was an American Christian minister. Born in Monroe County, Tennessee, he was the founder of the Church of God.
His father, Richard Spurling (1810 – 1891) was an ordained Baptist elder, who presided over the founding of the church on August 10, 1886. R. G. Spurling was chosen as its minister and ordained a month later.

References

1857 births
1935 deaths
People from Monroe County, Tennessee